Kochcice  is a village in the administrative district of Gmina Kochanowice, within Lubliniec County, Silesian Voivodeship, in southern Poland.

The village has a population of 1,895.

References

Kochcice